Hadi Rekabi (born March 29, 1985) is an Iranian footballer who plays for Nassaji in the Azadegan League.

Club career
Rekabi started his career with Naft Tehran.

References

Living people
Naft Tehran F.C. players
Iranian footballers
People from Babolsar
1985 births
Association football midfielders
Sportspeople from Mazandaran province